ViralZone is a Swiss Institute of Bioinformatics web-resource for all viral genus and families, providing general molecular and epidemiological information, along with virion and genome figures.

References

External links

 

Biological databases
Virology